Nathan Gilbert Eric Wicht (born 20 February 2004) is a Swiss professional footballer who plays as a midfielder for  club 1860 Munich.

Club career
Born in Zürich, Wicht played for SpVgg Unterhaching before joining 1860 Munich's academy in 2016. In summer 2021, he signed his first professional contract with the club. He made his senior debut on 24 August 2021 as a late substitute in a 3–0 win over Viktoria Köln.

International career
Wicht has represented Switzerland at under-15, under-16 and under-18.

References

2004 births
Living people
Swiss men's footballers
Footballers from Zürich
Association football midfielders
Switzerland youth international footballers
3. Liga players
TSV 1860 Munich players
TSV 1860 Munich II players
Swiss expatriate footballers
Swiss expatriate sportspeople in Germany
Expatriate footballers in Germany